Astghashen or Dashbulag is a village de facto in the Askeran Province of the breakaway Republic of Artsakh, de jure in the Khojaly District of Azerbaijan, in the disputed region of Nagorno-Karabakh. The village has an ethnic Armenian-majority population, and also had an Armenian majority in 1989.

Toponymy 
The village was historically known as Karaghbyur. The name Astghashen means "village of stars", with the word Astgh meaning "star" in Armenian, referring to the famous star-shaped fossils of the village.

History 
The village is known for its star-shaped fossils. The fossils originate from small marine animals that lived in the Tethys Ocean that covered the area millions of years ago. There are also many other types of fossils in the area.

During the Soviet period, the village was a part of the Askeran District in the Nagorno-Karabakh Autonomous Oblast of Azerbaijan SSR. The village has been administered by the Republic of Artsakh as a part of its Askeran Province since the First Nagorno-Karabakh War.

After the 2020 Nagorno-Karabakh war, Artsakh launched the construction of a new settlement for IDPs close to Astghashen, on the road towards the neighboring village of Patara, for people displaced from the villages of Sghnakh, Jraghatsner, Madatashen and Moshkhmhat in the Askeran Province.

Historical heritage sites 
Historical heritage sites in and around the village include burial sites from the 2nd–1st millennia BCE, a 14th-century tomb about 4 km southwest of the village, St. George's Church built in 1898, with two 16th/17th-century khachkars, and a spring monument from 1930.

Economy and culture 
The population is mainly engaged in agriculture and animal husbandry. As of 2015, the village has a municipal building, a secondary school, a house of culture, two shops, and a medical centre. The Astghashen Art School is also located in the village.

Demographics 
The village had 520 inhabitants in 2005, and 507 inhabitants in 2015.

Gallery

References

External links 

 
 

Populated places in Askeran Province
Populated places in Khojaly District